The 2007–08 football season was Watford Football Club's 62nd consecutive season of competitive football since the Second World War. It began on 1 July 2007, and concluded on 30 June 2008, although competitive games were only played between August and May.

Season summary

Following relegation from the Premier League in 2006–07, Watford started the 2007–08 season strongly, winning eleven of their opening sixteen games and opening up an 8-point gap at the top of the Championship table. However, after the departure of Adam Johnson to Middlesbrough on 11 November 2007 Watford's form declined; they won six of their next sixteen Championship games, and only one of their final sixteen. In January 2008 Watford sold captain Gavin Mahon and top scorer Marlon King, but purchased Mat Sadler, Leigh Bromby and John Eustace. Watford finished the 2007–08 season in 6th position, and were eliminated in the play-off semi finals to Hull City.

Legend

Friendlies

Football League

League standings by round

Play-offs

Watford's sixth-placed finish meant that they qualified for the play-off semi finals, where they would play a home and away match against third-placed Hull City. As 6–1 aggregate winners, Hull qualified for the final at Wembley Stadium, and as a result of victory in that match they earned qualification to the Premier League for the 2008–09 season.

Semi final first leg

Semi final second leg

FA Cup

As a Championship club, Watford did not enter the FA Cup until the third round stage. Their potential opponents were the 20 Premier League teams, the 23 other Championship clubs, and 20 teams from lower divisions which had progressed through the first and second rounds, and in some cases additional qualifying games.

Third round

Fourth round

League Cup

For the 2007–08 season, all Football League clubs entered the League Cup in the first round. For the first round, the draw was split into two regional sections of 36 teams. The 18 highest placed teams in the league from the previous season were seeded in each region. Watford, having been relegated from the Premier League, were therefore seeded, and placed in the southern section of the draw.

First round

Second round

Ownership and finance

Watford Football Club is owned by the holding company Watford Leisure Plc (LSE: WFC). Its 2007–08 financial year coincided with the football season, running from 1 July 2007 until 30 June 2008. The company's annual accounts were released in November 2008, showing an operating loss of £10.977 million, but a net profit of £426,000 as a result of the sale of player registrations and land. Watford Leisure's chief executive was Mark Ashton, while their chairman was self-professed lifelong Watford fan Graham Simpson, who also owned shares in the company. The club's other major shareholders were Deputy Chairman of the Conservative Party Michael Ashcroft through his investment company Fordwat, and brothers Jimmy and Vince Russo through their business Valley Grown Salads.

Squad details

Player statistics
Key

# = Squad number; Pos = Playing position; P = Number of games played; G = Number of goals scored;  = Yellow cards;  = Red cards; GK = Goalkeeper; DF = Defender; MF = Midfielder; FW = Forward

Statistics do not include games played for other clubs. Starting appearances are given first, followed by substitute appearances in parentheses where applicable. 

This table of statistics is incomplete. You can help by expanding it.

Transfers

In

Out

Loans in

Loans out

Footnotes

References

Watford F.C. seasons
Watford